Tung Wah Group of Hospitals Wong Tai Sin Hospital is Charitable hospital, It is Rehabilitation Hospital under the Tung Wah Group of Hospitals. It is most commonly referred to by its short name "TWGHs Wong Tai Sin Hospital" or just "Wong Tai Sin Hospital". It is one of two hospitals in the Wong Tai Sin area in New Kowloon of Hong Kong.

History
The hospital was established in 1965 and became a public hospital in 1991. The hospital was first developed as an infirmary to treat chronically ill elderly people. It has gradually expanded its role as an extended care institution in which intensive trans-disciplinary rehabilitative training programmes are designed for patients to facilitate their early reintegration into society.

References

Hospital buildings completed in 1965
Hospitals in Hong Kong
Wong Tai Sin Hospital
Wong Tai Sin
Hospitals established in 1965